The Warren is a suburban area in Berkshire, England, and a conurbation of Bracknell, adjacent to the large expanses of Swinley Forest, part of the Crown Estate. The Warren and the neighbouring suburb Martins Heron are after a Parliamentary Boundary review in the Bracknell constituency - until 2010 they were in the Windsor Constituency. It is in Harmans Water ward, which also includes parts of Bullbrook, and  The Parks.

The settlement lies near to the Waterloo to Reading Line, and is served by Martins Heron railway station.

References

Populated places in Berkshire
Bracknell
Winkfield